The International Journal of Technology Assessment in Health Care is a bimonthly peer-reviewed healthcare journal covering health technology assessment. Established in 1985, it is published by Cambridge University Press on behalf of Health Technology Assessment International, of which it is the official journal. The editor-in-chief is Wendy Babidge (Royal Australasian College of Surgeons). According to the Journal Citation Reports, the journal has a 2017 impact factor of 1.333, ranking it 20th out of 25 journals in the category "Medical Informatics", 71st out of 94 in the category "Health Care Sciences & Services", and 125th out of 180 in the category "Public, Environmental & Occupational Health".

References

External links

Biomedical informatics journals
Cambridge University Press academic journals
Publications established in 1985
Bimonthly journals
English-language journals
Healthcare journals
Public health journals